This is a list of scientific equations named after people (eponymous equations).

See also
 Eponym
 List of eponymous laws
 List of laws in science
 List of equations
 Scientific constants named after people
 Scientific phenomena named after people
 Scientific laws named after people

References

Equations named after people
Scientific equations named after people
Equations
Equations